Blerta Smaili (born 8 May 2002) is a Kosovan-Albanian German footballer who plays as a midfielder for German club VfL Sindelfingen and the Kosovo national team.

See also
List of Kosovo women's international footballers

References

2002 births
Living people
Kosovan women's footballers
Women's association football midfielders
Kosovo women's international footballers
Kosovan expatriate footballers
Kosovan expatriate sportspeople in Germany
Expatriate women's footballers in Germany